The 2010–11 Toronto Raptors season is the 16th season of the Toronto Raptors in the National Basketball Association (NBA). The Raptors did not have Chris Bosh for the first time since 2002-03, as he departed in free agency to the Miami Heat, teaming up with fellow NBA Superstars and 2003 draftees LeBron James and Dwyane Wade, and beginning the Heat's Big 3 era. Bosh's departure caused the Raptors to start rebuilding and began the DeMar DeRozan era, which would last for the next 8 years. They finished with a 22-60 record missing the playoffs for a third consecutive year.

Roster

Awards, records and milestones

Awards

Week/Month

All-Star

Season

Records

Milestones

Summary

Pre-season
Before the 2010–11 season began, there was much anticipation around the league over the fates of an elite pack of free agents, featuring the likes of Raptors franchise player Chris Bosh, Dwyane Wade, LeBron James, and Amar'e Stoudemire. Bosh and James eventually chose to converge in Miami with Wade, and the sign and trade transaction that ensued resulted in the Raptors receiving two first-round draft picks and a trade exception from Miami. Prior to this, Toronto had drafted Ed Davis, also a left-handed power forward like Bosh, acquired Solomon Alabi from the Dallas Mavericks, and picked up Joey Dorsey. Amir Johnson was signed to a new deal, and Linas Kleiza was made an offer sheet that Denver later refused to match. After Bosh left, General Manager Bryan Colangelo sought to trade Reggie Evans, José Calderón—the last remaining Raptor from the pre-Colangelo days—and the disenchanted Hedo Türkoğlu to the Charlotte Bobcats for Tyson Chandler, Boris Diaw, Leandro Barbosa and Dwayne Jones. Barbosa was drafted by Colangelo when the latter was still with the Phoenix Suns, and Diaw played there during Colangelo's tenure too. However, the trade involving Chandler/Diaw/Evans/Calderón fell apart at the last minute when Chandler was traded to Dallas instead. A sign-and-trade involving Orlando's Matt Barnes was also in the works, but ran into last-minute difficulties as well. In the coaching department, P. J. Carlesimo joined the team of assistant coaches, while Marc Iavaroni left for the Los Angeles Clippers.

Game log

|- bgcolor="#ccffcc"
| 1
| October 6
| @ Phoenix
| 
| Linas Kleiza (20)
| Joey Dorsey (10)
| Jarrett Jack (7)
| Rogers Arena18,123
| 1–0
|- bgcolor="#ffcccc"
| 2
| October 10
| @ Boston
| 
| Jarrett Jack (18)
| Reggie Evans,Jarrett Jack,Linas Kleiza (6)
| José Calderón (6)
| TD Garden18,624
| 1–1
|- bgcolor="#ffcccc"
| 3
| October 12
| @ Chicago
| 
| Leandro Barbosa (20)
| Reggie Evans (5)
| José Calderón (7)
| United Center20,165
| 1–2
|- bgcolor="#ccffcc"
| 4
| October 13
| Philadelphia
| 
| Jarrett Jack (24)
| Amir Johnson (9)
| José Calderón (8)
| Air Canada Centre12,078
| 2–2
|- bgcolor="#ffcccc"
| 5
| October 15
| Boston
| 
| Linas Kleiza,Andrea Bargnani (15)
| Reggie Evans (8)
| Sonny Weems (4)
| Air Canada Centre13,763
| 2–3
|- bgcolor="#ccffcc"
| 6
| October 17
| Phoenix
| 
| Linas Kleiza (23)
| Reggie Evans (12)
| José Calderón (6)
| Air Canada Centre12,902
| 3–3
|- bgcolor="#ffcccc"
| 7
| October 20
| Chicago
| 
| Leandro Barbosa (22)
| Reggie Evans (16)
| Jarrett Jack (6)
| Air Canada Centre12,681
| 3–4
|- bgcolor="#ccffcc"
| 8
| October 22
| New York
| 
| Andrea Bargnani (15)
| Reggie Evans (11)
| José Calderón (6)
| Bell Centre22,114
| 4–4
|-

Regular season
13 games into the season, the Raptors traded Jarrett Jack, David Andersen, and Marcus Banks to the New Orleans Hornets for Peja Stojaković and Jerryd Bayless. On 24 November, in a game against Boston Celtics, Reggie Evans—then Toronto's leading and the league's third-leading rebounder—was injured and ruled out for eight weeks. Toronto's leading scorer, Andrea Bargnani, had a spell on the sidelines due to injury not long after. Leading up to the All-Star break, Toronto went on a 13-game losing streak. The Raptors concluded the regular season with just 22 wins, and did not qualify for the 2011 NBA Playoffs.

Standings

Game log

|- bgcolor="#ffcccc"
| 1
| October 27
| New York
| 
| Andrea Bargnani (22)
| Reggie Evans (16)
| José Calderón (7)
| Air Canada Centre18,722
| 0–1
|- bgcolor="#ccffcc"
| 2
| October 29
| Cleveland
| 
| Andrea Bargnani (20)
| Reggie Evans (14)
| José Calderón (7)
| Air Canada Centre15,711
| 1–1
|-

|- bgcolor="#ffcccc"
| 3
| November 1
| @ Sacramento
| 
| Andrea Bargnani (28)
| Reggie Evans (19)
| José Calderón,Jarrett Jack (5)
| ARCO Arena17,317
| 1–2
|- bgcolor="#ffcccc"
| 4
| November 3
| @ Utah
| 
| Andrea Bargnani (26)
| Andrea Bargnani (9)
| Jarrett Jack (4)
| EnergySolutions Arena17,802
| 1–3
|- bgcolor="#ffcccc"
| 5
| November 5
| @ L.A. Lakers
| 
| Leandro Barbosa (17)
| Amir Johnson (15)
| José Calderón (8)
| Staples Center18,997
| 1–4
|- bgcolor="#ffcccc"
| 6
| November 6
| @ Portland
| 
| Jarrett Jack (16)
| Reggie Evans (9)
| José Calderón (4)
| Rose Garden Arena20,363
| 1–5
|- bgcolor="#ffcccc"
| 7
| November 8
| Golden State
| 
| Jarrett Jack (24)
| Linas Kleiza (7)
| Jarrett Jack (8)
| Air Canada Centre14,127
| 1–6
|- bgcolor="#ffcccc"
| 8
| November 10
| Charlotte
| 
| Andrea Bargnani (23)
| Reggie Evans (10)
| José Calderón (9)
| Air Canada Centre14,309
| 1–7
|- bgcolor="#ccffcc"
| 9
| November 12
| @ Orlando
| 
| Andrea Bargnani (27)
| Reggie Evans (12)
| José Calderón (7)
| Amway Center18,846
| 2–7
|- bgcolor="#ffcccc"
| 10
| November 13
| @ Miami
| 
| Andrea Bargnani (22)
| Joey Dorsey (11)
| Sonny Weems (5)
| American Airlines Arena19,600
| 2–8
|- bgcolor="#ffcccc"
| 11
| November 16
| @ Washington
| 
| Sonny Weems (16)
| Reggie Evans (9)
| Jarrett Jack (5)
| Verizon Center11,513
| 2–9
|- bgcolor="#ccffcc"
| 12
| November 17
| @ Philadelphia
| 
| Andrea Bargnani (30)
| Reggie Evans (14)
| José Calderón (8)
| Wells Fargo Center12,164
| 3–9
|- bgcolor="#ccffcc"
| 13
| November 19
| Houston
| 
| Andrea Bargnani (26)
| Reggie Evans (9)
| Jarrett Jack (8)
| Air Canada Centre17,369
| 4–9
|- bgcolor="#ccffcc"
| 14
| November 21
| Boston
| 
| Andrea Bargnani (29)
| Reggie Evans (16)
| Leandro Barbosa (5)
| Air Canada Centre17,707
| 5–9
|- bgcolor="#ccffcc"
| 15
| November 24
| Philadelphia
| 
| Andrea Bargnani (24)
| Reggie Evans (22)
| José Calderón (9)
| Air Canada Centre15,012
| 6–9
|- bgcolor="#ffcccc"
| 16
| November 26
| @ Boston
| 
| Linas Kleiza (18)
| Andrea Bargnani (8)
| José Calderón (15)
| TD Garden18,624
| 6–10
|- bgcolor="#ffcccc"
| 17
| November 28
| Atlanta
| 
| Andrea Bargnani (14)
| Andrea Bargnani (7)
| José Calderón (5)
| Air Canada Centre17,302
| 6–11
|-

|- bgcolor="#ccffcc"
| 18
| December 1
| Washington
| 
| DeMar DeRozan (20)
| Andrea Bargnani,Joey Dorsey (8)
| José Calderón (8)
| Air Canada Centre15,209
| 7–11
|-bgcolor="#ccffcc"
| 19
| December 3
| Oklahoma City
| 
| Andrea Bargnani (26)
| Andrea Bargnani (12)
| José Calderón (15)
| Air Canada Centre16,774
| 8–11
|- bgcolor="#ffcccc"
| 20
| December 5
| New York
| 
| Jerryd Bayless (23)
| Amir Johnson (16)
| Jerryd Bayless,José Calderón (6)
| Air Canada Centre16,891
| 8–12
|- bgcolor="#ffcccc"
| 21
| December 6
| @ Indiana
| 
| José Calderón (21)
| Amir Johnson (9)
| José Calderón (4)
| Conseco Fieldhouse11,930
| 8–13
|- bgcolor="#ffcccc"
| 22
| December 8
| @ New York
| 
| Andrea Bargnani (41)
| Andrea Bargnani,Linas Kleiza (7)
| José Calderón (7)
| Madison Square Garden19,763
| 8–14
|- bgcolor="#ffcccc"
| 23
| December 10
| Denver
| 
| Linas Kleiza (26)
| Linas Kleiza (12)
| Jerryd Bayless (5)
| Air Canada Centre14,715
| 8–15
|- bgcolor="#ccffcc"
| 24
| December 11
| @ Detroit
| 
| Jerryd Bayless (31)
| Andrea Bargnani,Jerryd Bayless,Ed Davis,Amir Johnson (5)
| Jerryd Bayless,Leandro Barbosa (7)
| The Palace of Auburn Hills13,343
| 9–15
|- bgcolor="#ffcccc"
| 25
| December 14
| @ Charlotte
| 
| Jerryd Bayless (17)
| Amir Johnson (12)
| Jerryd Bayless (9)
| Time Warner Cable Arena12,482
| 9–16
|- bgcolor="#ffcccc"
| 26
| December 15
| Chicago
| 
| Jerryd Bayless (20)
| Joey Dorsey (13)
| Sonny Weems (5)
| Air Canada Centre17,750
| 9–17
|- bgcolor="#ccffcc"
| 27
| December 17
| New Jersey
| 
| Andrea Bargnani (32)
| Linas Kleiza (12)
| José Calderón (14)
| Air Canada Centre14,623
| 10–17
|- bgcolor="#ffcccc"
| 28
| December 19
| L.A. Lakers
| 
| Linas Kleiza (26)
| Linas Kleiza (10)
| José Calderón (12)
| Air Canada Centre19,935
| 10–18
|- bgcolor="#ffcccc"
| 29
| December 22
| Detroit
| 
| Leandro Barbosa (21)
| Julian Wright (6)
| José Calderón (13)
| Air Canada Centre15,303
| 10–19
|- bgcolor="#ffcccc"
| 30
| December 27
| @ Memphis
| 
| Linas Kleiza (22)
| Joey Dorsey (13)
| José Calderón (9)
| FedExForum14,971
| 10–20
|- bgcolor="#ccffcc"
| 31
| December 28
| @ Dallas
| 
| Ed Davis (17)
| Ed Davis (12)
| Jerryd Bayless (8)
| American Airlines Center20,027
| 11–20
|- bgcolor="#ffcccc"
| 32
| December 31
| @ Houston
| 
| DeMar DeRozan (37)
| Linas Kleiza (12)
| José Calderón (11)
| Toyota Center18,121
| 11–21
|-

|- bgcolor="#ffcccc"
| 33
| January 2
| Boston
| 
| DeMar DeRozan (27)
| Joey Dorsey (13)
| José Calderón (10)
| Air Canada Centre19,986
| 11–22
|- bgcolor="#ffcccc"
| 34
| January 4
| @ Chicago
| 
| Andrea Bargnani (23)
| Andrea Bargnani (6)
| Jerryd Bayless (8)
| United Center21,290
| 11–23
|- bgcolor="#ccffcc"
| 35
| January 5
| @ Cleveland
| 
| Andrea Bargnani (25)
| Julian Wright (9)
| José Calderón (17)
| Quicken Loans Arena20,562
| 12–23
|- bgcolor="#ffcccc"
| 36
| January 7
| @ Boston
| 
| DeMar DeRozan (20)
| Joey Dorsey,Linas Kleiza (6)
| José Calderón (9)
| TD Garden18,624
| 12–24
|- bgcolor="#ccffcc"
| 37
| January 9
| Sacramento
| 
| Andrea Bargnani (30)
| Amir Johnson (9)
| José Calderón (9)
| Air Canada Centre17,206
| 13–24
|- bgcolor="#ffcccc"
| 38
| January 12
| Atlanta
| 
| Leandro Barbosa,Andrea Bargnani (26)
| Amir Johnson (7)
| José Calderón (9)
| Air Canada Centre14,186
| 13–25
|- bgcolor="#ffcccc"
| 39
| January 14
| Detroit
| 
| Andrea Bargnani (31)
| Amir Johnson (10)
| José Calderón (13)
| Air Canada Centre16,924
| 13–26
|- bgcolor="#ffcccc"
| 40
| January 15
| @ Washington
| 
| Andrea Bargnani (25)
| Amir Johnson (10)
| José Calderón (15)
| Verizon Center14,652
| 13–27
|- bgcolor="#ffcccc"
| 41
| January 17
| @ New Orleans
| 
| DeMar DeRozan (23)
| Ed Davis (12)
| José Calderón (13)
| New Orleans Arena15,155
| 13–28
|- bgcolor="#ffcccc"
| 42
| January 19
| @ San Antonio
| 
| DeMar DeRozan (28)
| Ed Davis (11)
| José Calderón (8)
| AT&T Center18,581
| 13–29
|- bgcolor="#ffcccc"
| 43
| January 21
| @ Orlando
| 
| DeMar DeRozan (16)
| Julian Wright (10)
| José Calderón (5)
| Amway Center19,047
| 13–30
|- bgcolor="#ffcccc"
| 44
| January 22
| @ Miami
| 
| DeMar DeRozan (30)
| Ed Davis (10)
| José Calderón (13)
| American Airlines Arena20,025
| 13–31
|- bgcolor="#ffcccc"
| 45
| January 24
| Memphis
| 
| Andrea Bargnani (29)
| DeMar DeRozan,Julian Wright (9)
| Jerryd Bayless (11)
| Air Canada Centre14,127
| 13–32
|- bgcolor="#ffcccc"
| 46
| January 26
| Philadelphia
| 
| DeMar DeRozan (29)
| Amir Johnson (6)
| José Calderón (13)
| Air Canada Centre14,552
| 13–33
|- bgcolor="#ffcccc"
| 47
| January 28
| Milwaukee
| 
| Amir Johnson (24)
| Amir Johnson (12)
| José Calderón (10)
| Air Canada Centre15,159
| 13–34
|- bgcolor="#ffcccc"
| 48
| January 29
| @ Minnesota
| 
| Andrea Bargnani,Ed Davis (15)
| Ed Davis (11)
| José Calderón,Trey Johnson (6)
| Target Center14,991
| 13–35
|- bgcolor="#ffcccc"
| 49
| January 31
| @ Indiana
| 
| Amir Johnson (18)
| Amir Johnson (8)
| José Calderón (7)
| Conseco Fieldhouse10,258
| 13–36
|-

|- bgcolor="#ffcccc"
| 50
| February 2
| @ Atlanta
| 
| Amir Johnson (20)
| Amir Johnson (14)
| José Calderón (10)
| Philips Arena14,025
| 13–37
|- bgcolor="#ccffcc"
| 51
| February 4
| Minnesota
| 
| Andrea Bargnani (30)
| Amir Johnson (12)
| José Calderón (19)
| Air Canada Centre14,389
| 14–37
|- bgcolor="#ffcccc"
| 52
| February 8
| @ Milwaukee
| 
| Andrea Bargnani (23)
| Amir Johnson (11)
| José Calderón (7)
| Bradley Center11,975
| 14–38
|- bgcolor="#ffcccc"
| 53
| February 9
| San Antonio
| 
| Andrea Bargnani (29)
| Amir Johnson (13)
| José Calderón (11)
| Air Canada Centre15,867
| 14–39
|- bgcolor="#ffcccc"
| 54
| February 11
| Portland
| 
| Andrea Bargnani (29)
| Ed Davis (13)
| José Calderón (10)
| Air Canada Centre15,625
| 14–40
|- bgcolor="#ccffcc"
| 55
| February 13
| L.A. Clippers
| 
| Andrea Bargnani (27)
| Ed Davis (14)
| José Calderón (11)
| Air Canada Centre19,800
| 15–40
|- bgcolor="#ffcccc"
| 56
| February 16
| Miami
| 
| Andrea Bargnani (38)
| Ed Davis (13)
| José Calderón (14)
| Air Canada Centre20,156
| 15–41
|- align="center"
|colspan="9" bgcolor="#bbcaff"|All-Star Break
|- bgcolor="#ffcccc"
| 57
| February 22
| @ Charlotte
| 
| Sonny Weems (19)
| Andrea Bargnani (8)
| José Calderón (11)
| Time Warner Cable Arena12,976
| 15–42
|- bgcolor="#ccffcc"
| 58
| February 23
| Chicago
| 
| Andrea Bargnani,DeMar DeRozan (24)
| Andrea Bargnani (8)
| José Calderón (17)
| Air Canada Centre18,105
| 16–42
|- bgcolor="#ffcccc"
| 59
| February 25
| Phoenix
| 
| Andrea Bargnani (26)
| Jerryd Bayless,Ed Davis (5)
| José Calderón (7)
| Air Canada Centre19,004
| 16–43
|- bgcolor="#ffcccc"
| 60
| February 27
| Dallas
| 
| Amir Johnson (21)
| José Calderón (8)
| José Calderón (8)
| Air Canada Centre16,827
| 16–44
|-

|- bgcolor="#ccffcc"
| 61
| March 1
| New Orleans
| 
| José Calderón (22)
| Amir Johnson (10)
| José Calderón (16)
| Air Canada Centre14,704
| 17–44
|- bgcolor="#ffcccc"
| 62
| March 4
| @ New Jersey
| 
| DeMar DeRozan (30)
| Ed Davis (8)
| José Calderón (12)
| O2 Arena18,689
| 17–45
|- bgcolor="#ffcccc"
| 63
| March 5
| @ New Jersey
| 
| Andrea Bargnani (35)
| Ed Davis (15)
| José Calderón (9)
| O2 Arena18,689
| 17–46
|- bgcolor="#ffcccc"
| 64
| March 9
| Utah
| 
| DeMar DeRozan (17)
| Reggie Evans (11)
| José Calderón (6)
| Air Canada Centre14,425
| 17–47
|- bgcolor="#ccffcc"
| 65
| March 11
| Indiana
| 
| Leandro Barbosa (29)
| Reggie Evans (16)
| José Calderón (8)
| Air Canada Centre14,726
| 18–47
|- bgcolor="#ffcccc"
| 66
| March 13
| Charlotte
| 
| Andrea Bargnani (17)
| Reggie Evans (17)
| José Calderón (7)
| Air Canada Centre16,557
| 18–48
|- bgcolor="#ffcccc"
| 67
| March 16
| @ Detroit
| 
| Andrea Bargnani (20)
| Reggie Evans (8)
| José Calderón (6)
| The Palace of Auburn Hills15,166
| 18–49
|- bgcolor="#ccffcc"
| 68
| March 18
| Washington
| 
| Andrea Bargnani (33)
| Reggie Evans (15)
| José Calderón (6)
| Air Canada Centre18,017
| 19–49
|- bgcolor="#ccffcc"
| 69
| March 20
| @ Oklahoma City
| 
| Andrea Bargnani (23)
| Reggie Evans (9)
| José Calderón (9)
| Oklahoma City Arena18,203
| 20–49
|- bgcolor="#ffcccc"
| 70
| March 21
| @ Denver
| 
| Andrea Bargnani (20)
| Alexis Ajinça,Reggie Evans (9)
| Jerryd Bayless (9)
| Pepsi Center16,258
| 20–50
|- bgcolor="#ffcccc"
| 71
| March 23
| @ Phoenix
| 
| Andrea Bargnani (27)
| Ed Davis (9)
| José Calderón (13)
| US Airways Center17,865
| 20–51
|- bgcolor="#ffcccc"
| 72
| March 25
| @ Golden State
| 
| Leandro Barbosa,DeMar DeRozan (19)
| Ed Davis (11)
| Andrea Bargnani,José Calderón,Sonny Weems (5)
| Oracle Arena17,504
| 20–52
|- bgcolor="#ffcccc"
| 73
| March 26
| @ L.A. Clippers
| 
| Ed Davis (21)
| Ed Davis (11)
| Leandro Barbosa (6)
| Staples Center19,060
| 20–53
|- bgcolor="#ffcccc"
| 74
| March 30
| Milwaukee
| 
| Andrea Bargnani (22)
| James Johnson (10)
| José Calderón (8)
| Air Canada Centre15,906
| 20–54
|-

|- bgcolor="#ffcccc"
| 75
| April 2
| @ Chicago
| 
| Jerryd Bayless,DeMar DeRozan (26)
| Ed Davis (11)
| Jerryd Bayless (8)
| United Center22,228
| 20–55
|- bgcolor="#ccffcc"
| 76
| April 3
| Orlando
| 
| DeMar DeRozan (24)
| Reggie Evans (17)
| Jerryd Bayless (8)
| Air Canada Centre19,800
| 21–55
|- bgcolor="#ffcccc"
| 77
| April 5
| @ New York
| 
| DeMar DeRozan (36)
| Ed Davis (13)
| Jerryd Bayless (5)
| Madison Square Garden19,763
| 21–56
|- bgcolor="#ffcccc"
| 78
| April 6
| Cleveland
| 
| Jerryd Bayless (28)
| Reggie Evans (13)
| José Calderón (9)
| Air Canada Centre14,886
| 21–57
|- bgcolor="#ffcccc"
| 79
| April 8
| @ Philadelphia
| 
| DeMar DeRozan (27)
| Reggie Evans (15)
| Jerryd Bayless (8)
| Wells Fargo Center16,362
| 21–58
|- bgcolor="#ccffcc"
| 80
| April 10
| New Jersey
| 
| Jerryd Bayless (19)
| Reggie Evans (15)
| James Johnson (6)
| Air Canada Centre17,755
| 22–58
|- bgcolor="#ffcccc"
| 81
| April 11
| @ Milwaukee
| 
| Jerryd Bayless (20)
| Joey Dorsey (20)
| Jerryd Bayless (5)
| Bradley Center13,279
| 22–59
|- bgcolor="#ffcccc"
| 82
| April 13
| Miami
| 
| Jerryd Bayless (21)
| Ed Davis (8)
| James Johnson (6)
| Air Canada Centre20,108
| 22–60
|-

Player statistics

Season

|-
| *
| 24 || 0 || 11.0 || .465 || .333 || .733 || 2.5 || .3 || .3 || .6 || 4.8
|-
| 
| 12 || 0 || 4.9 || .200 || .000 || .000 || 1.2 || .2 || .2 || .2 || .5
|-
| *
| 29 || 0 || 7.7 || .446 || .385 || .467 || 1.7 || .2 || .1 || .2 || 2.7
|-
| 
| 3 || 0 || 7.3 || .000 || .000 || .750 || .3 || 1.0 || .3 || .0 || 2.0
|-
| 
| 58 || 0 || 24.1 || .450 || .338 || .796 || 1.7 || 2.1 || .9 || .1 || 13.3
|-
| 
| 66 || 66 ||style="background:#000000;color:#D3D3D3;"| 35.7 || .448 || .345|| .820 || 5.2 || 1.8 || .5 || .7 ||style="background:#000000;color:#D3D3D3;"| 21.4
|-
| *
| 60 || 14 || 22.4 || .429 || .348 || .810 || 2.5 || 4.0 || .6 || .1 || 10.0
|-
| 
| 68 || 55 || 30.9 || .440 || .365 || .854 || 3.0 ||style="background:#000000;color:#D3D3D3;"| 8.9 ||style="background:#000000;color:#D3D3D3;"| 1.2 || .1 || 9.8
|-
| 
| 65 || 17 || 24.6 || .576 || .000 || .555 || 7.1 || .6 || .6 || 1.0 || 7.7
|-
| 
|style="background:#000000;color:#D3D3D3;"| 82 ||style="background:#000000;color:#D3D3D3;"| 82 || 34.8 || .467 || .096 || .813 || 3.8 || 1.8 || 1.0 || .4 || 17.2
|-
| 
| 43 || 9 || 12.1 || .525 || .000 || .477 || 4.4 || .6 || .6 || .4 || 3.1
|-
| 
| 9|| 0 || 17.2 || .310 || .000 || .400 || 1.0 || 4.3 || .1 || .0 || 1.9
|-
| 
| 30 || 18 || 26.6 || .408 || .000 || .545 ||style="background:#000000;color:#D3D3D3;"| 11.5 || 1.3 || 1.0 || .2 || 4.4
|-
| *
| 6 || 0 || 15.0 || .429 || .200 || .330 || 1.3 || 1.8 || .7 || .2 || 5.8
|-
| *
| 13 || 13 || 26.7 || .393 || .167 || .870 || 3.2 || 4.5 || 1.1 || .0 || 10.8
|-
| 
| 72 || 54 || 25.7 || .568 || .000 || .787 || 6.4 || 1.1 || .7 ||style="background:#000000;color:#D3D3D3;"| 1.2 || 9.6
|-
| *
| 25 || 25 || 28.0 || .464 || .240 || .707 || 4.7 || 3.0 || 1.0 || 1.1 || 9.2
|-
| *
| 7 || 0 || 11.6 || .333 || .333 || .875 || 1.0 || 1.6 || .1 || .1 || 4.0
|-
| 
| 39 || 23 || 26.5 || .438 || .298 || .631 || 4.5 || 1.0 || .5 || .2 || 11.2
|-
| *
| 2 || 0 || 11.0 ||style="background:#000000;color:#D3D3D3;"| .700 ||style="background:#000000;color:#D3D3D3;"| .667 ||style="background:#000000;color:#D3D3D3;"| 1.000 || 1.5 || .5 || .0 || .0 || 10.0
|-
| 
| 59 || 28 || 23.9 || .444 || .279 || .766 || 2.6 || 1.8 || .6 || .0 || 9.2
|-
| 
| 52 || 6 || 14.7 || .512 || .200 || .512 || 2.3 || 1.1 || .8 || .4 || 3.6
|}

* – Stats with the Raptors.

Transactions

Trades

|

Free agents

Additions

Subtractions

References

External links

 2010–11 Toronto Raptors season at ESPN
 2010–11 Toronto Raptors season at Basketball Reference

Toronto Raptors seasons
Toronto
Tor